Lost Horizon is a 1937 American adventure drama fantasy film directed by Frank Capra. The screenplay by Robert Riskin is based on the 1933 novel of the same name by James Hilton.

The film exceeded its original budget by more than $776,000 and took five years to earn back its cost. The serious financial crisis it created for Columbia Pictures damaged the partnership between Capra and studio head Harry Cohn, as well as the friendship between Capra and Riskin.

In 2016, the film was selected for preservation in the United States National Film Registry by the Library of Congress as being "culturally, historically, or aesthetically significant".

Plot 
It is 1935. Before returning to Britain to become the new Foreign Secretary, writer, soldier, and diplomat Robert Conway has one last task in China, rescuing 90 westerners in the city of Baskul. He flies out with the last few evacuees, just ahead of armed revolutionaries.

Unbeknownst to the passengers, the pilot has been forcibly replaced and their aircraft hijacked. It eventually runs out of fuel and crashes deep in the Himalayas, killing their abductor. The group is rescued by Chang and his men and taken to Shangri-La, an idyllic valley sheltered from the bitter cold. The contented inhabitants are led by the mysterious High Lama.

Initially anxious to return to civilization, most of the newcomers grow to love Shangri-La, including paleontologist Alexander Lovett, notorious swindler Henry Barnard, and bitter, terminally ill Gloria Stone, who, miraculously, seems to be recovering. Conway is particularly enchanted, especially when he meets Sondra, who has grown up in Shangri-La. However, Conway's younger brother George and Maria, another beautiful young woman they find there, are determined to leave.

Conway eventually has an audience with the High Lama and learns that his arrival was no accident. The founder of Shangri-La is said to be two hundred years old, preserved, like the other residents, by the magical properties of the paradise he has created, but is finally dying and needs someone wise and knowledgeable in the ways of the modern world to keep it safe. Having read Conway's writings, Sondra believed he was the one; the Lama had agreed with her and arranged for Conway's abduction. The old man names Conway as his successor and then peacefully passes away.

George refuses to believe the Lama's fantastic story and is supported by Maria. Uncertain and torn between love and loyalty, Conway reluctantly gives in to his brother and they leave, taking Maria with them, despite being warned that she is much older than she appears. After several days of grueling travel, she becomes exhausted and falls face down in the snow. When they turn Maria over, they discover that she had become extremely old and died. Horrified, George loses his sanity and jumps to his death.

Conway continues on and eventually ends up in a Chinese mission where a search party finds him. The ordeal has caused him to lose his memory of Shangri-La. On the voyage back to Britain, he starts remembering everything; he tells his story and then jumps ship. The searchers track him back to the Himalayas, but are unable to follow him any further. Conway succeeds in returning to Shangri-La.

Cast

 Ronald Colman as Robert Conway
 Jane Wyatt as Sondra 
 Edward Everett Horton as Lovett
 John Howard as George Conway 
 Thomas Mitchell as Barnard
 Margo as Maria
 Isabel Jewell as Gloria
 H. B. Warner as Chang
 Sam Jaffe as High Lama

Uncredited
 Hugh Buckler as Lord Gainsford
 Sonny Bupp as Boy being carried to plane
 Willie Fung as Bandit leader at fuel stop-over
 Noble Johnson as Leader of porters on return journey
 Richard Loo as Shanghai airport official
 Margaret McWade as Missionary
 Leonard Mudie as Foreign Secretary
 David Torrence as Prime Minister
 Victor Wong as Bandit leader
 Chief John Big Tree as Porter

Production
Frank Capra had read the James Hilton novel while filming It Happened One Night, and he intended to make Lost Horizon his next project. When Ronald Colman, his first and only choice for the role of Robert Conway, proved to be unavailable, Capra decided to wait and made Mr. Deeds Goes to Town (1936) instead.

Harry Cohn authorized a budget of $1.25 million for the film, the largest amount ever allocated to a project up to that time. According to a 1986 Variety interview with Frank Capra Jr., his father had wanted to shoot the film in color, but because the only suitable stock footage he intended to incorporate into the film, such as scenes from a documentary about the Himalayas, was in black and white, he was forced to change his plans. In 1985, Capra Sr. said the decision to film in black and white was made because three-strip Technicolor was new and fairly expensive, and the studio was unwilling to increase the film's budget so he could utilize it.

An often repeated story concerns casting the part of the High Lama.  After a screen test of 56-year-old retired stage actor A. E. Anson, Capra decided that he was just right for the part. He made a call to the actor's home, and the housekeeper who answered the phone was told to relay the message to Anson that the part was his.  Not long after, the housekeeper called back telling Capra that when Anson heard the news, he had a heart attack and died.  Subsequently, Capra offered the part to 58-year-old Henry B. Walthall.  He died before shooting began.  Finally, to play it safer age-wise, Capra cast Sam Jaffe who was just 45. This is disputed, however, by camera logs dating back to the production that indicate Anson never tested for the part. Film historian Kendall Miller surmises that this story originated as an effort to add drama to Jaffe's casting.

From the beginning, Capra ran into difficulties that resulted in serious cost overruns. Principal photography began on March 23, 1936, and by the time it was completed on July 17, the director had spent $1.6 million. Contributing to the added expenses was the filming of snow scenes and aircraft interiors at the Los Angeles Ice and Cold Storage Warehouse, where the low temperature affected the equipment and caused lengthy delays. The Streamline Moderne sets representing Shangri-La, designed by Stephen Goosson, had been constructed adjacent to Hollywood Way, a busy thoroughfare by day, which necessitated filming at night and heavily added to overtime expenses. Many exteriors were filmed on location in Palm Springs, Lucerne Valley, the Ojai Valley, the Mojave Desert, the Sierra Nevada Mountains, and in what is now Westlake Village, adding the cost of transporting cast, crew, and equipment to the swelling budget.

Capra also used multiple cameras to cover every scene from several angles, and by the time shooting ended, he had used 1.1 million feet of film. For one scene lasting four minutes, he shot 6,000 feet, the equivalent of one hour of screen time. He spent six days filming Sam Jaffe performing the High Lama's monologues, then reshot the scenes twice, once with Walter Connolly, because it was felt Jaffe's makeup was unconvincing and he looked too young for the role. A total of 40 minutes of footage featuring the High Lama eventually was trimmed to the 12 that appeared in the final cut. Filming took one hundred days, 34 more than scheduled. The film's final cost, including prints and promotional advertising, was $2,626,620, and it remained in the red until it was reissued in 1942.

The first cut of the film was six hours long. The studio considered releasing it in two parts, but eventually decided the idea was impractical. Working with editors Gene Havlick and Gene Milford, Capra managed to trim the running time to 3½ hours for the first preview in Santa Barbara on November 22, 1936. Following a showing of the screwball comedy Theodora Goes Wild, the audience was not receptive to a drama of epic length. Many walked out, and those who remained laughed at sequences intended to be serious. The feedback was mostly negative, and Capra was so distraught, he fled to Lake Arrowhead and remained in seclusion there for several days. He later claimed he burned the first two reels of the film, an account disputed by Milford, who noted setting the nitrate film on fire would have created a devastating explosion.

Following the disastrous preview, Capra made extensive cuts and, on January 12, 1937, reshot scenes involving the High Lama written by Sidney Buchman, who declined screen credit for his work. The new footage placed more emphasis on the growing desperation of the world situation at the time. Still unhappy with the film's length, Harry Cohn intervened; he cancelled the February 1 opening and edited the film personally. When it premiered in San Francisco on March 2, it was 132 minutes long. During the film's initial release in selected cities, it was a roadshow attraction, with only two presentations per day and tickets sold on a reserved-seat basis. Because the box-office returns were so low, the studio head cut an additional 14 minutes before the film went into general release the following September. Due primarily to the cuts made without his approval, Capra later filed a lawsuit against Columbia, citing "contractual disagreements", among them, the studio's refusal to pay him a $100,000 semi-annual salary payment due him. A settlement was reached on November 27, 1937, with Capra collecting his money and being relieved of the obligation of making one of the five films required by his contract. In 1985, the director claimed Cohn, whom he described as the "Jewish producer," trimmed the film simply so theaters could have more daily showings and increase the film's chance of turning a profit.

Reception

Frank S. Nugent of The New York Times called it, "a grand adventure film, magnificently staged, beautifully photographed, and capitally played." He continued,

[T]here is no denying the opulence of the production, the impressiveness of the sets, the richness of the costuming, the satisfying attention to large and small detail which makes Hollywood at its best such a generous entertainer. We can deride the screen in its lesser moods, but when the West Coast impresarios decide to shoot the works the resulting pyrotechnics bathe us in a warm and cheerful glow. ... The penultimate scenes are as vivid, swift, and brilliantly achieved as the first. Only the conclusion itself is somehow disappointing. But perhaps that is inescapable, for there can be no truly satisfying end to any fantasy. ... Mr. Capra was guilty of a few directorial clichés, but otherwise it was a perfect job. Unquestionably the picture has the best photography and sets of the year. By all means it is worth seeing.

Nugent later named it one of the 10 best films of the year.

The Hollywood Reporter called it "an artistic tour de force ... in all ways, a triumph for Frank Capra." Variety called it a "sterling" adaptation of Hilton's novel that "can take its place with the best prestige pictures of the industry." The Film Daily declared it an "Impressive and artistic drama" and "distinctly a worthwhile contribution to the industry."

Less enthusiastic was Otis Ferguson, who in his review for National Board of Review Magazine observed, "This film was made with obvious care and expense, but it will be notable in the future only as the first wrong step in a career that till now has been a denial of the very tendencies in pictures which this film represents." John Mosher of The New Yorker praised the "beautiful flying scenes" and the "wild and terrifying bits of struggle on mountain peaks and crags", but found the adaptation in general to be "somewhat longish and wearisome on the screen. I thought the old lama would go on talking forever." Joseph McBride in a later biography notes that Capra's emphasis on theme rather than people was evident in the film; he also considered the film a financial "debacle".

In The Spectator, Graham Greene agreed with the less enthusiastic American reviewers. Nothing reveals men's characters more than their Utopias ... this Utopia closely resembles a film star's luxurious estate on Beverly Hills: flirtatious pursuits through grape arbours, splashings and divings in blossomy pools under improbable waterfalls, and rich and enormous meals ... something incurably American: a kind of aerated idealism ('We have one simple rule, Kindness') and, of course, a girl (Miss Jane Wyatt, one of the dumber stars), who has read all the best books (this one included) and has the coy comradely manner of a not too advanced schoolmistress. For Greene, the film is "very long" and "very dull ... as soon as the opening scenes are over". He also regretted the film's missed opportunities: "If the long, dull ethical sequences had been cut to the bone there would have been plenty of room for the real story: the shock of Western crudity and injustice on a man returned from a more gentle and beautiful way of life".

Lost Horizon earned theatrical rentals of $3.5 million in the U.S. and Canada.

Awards and nominations
Stephen Goosson's elaborate sets won him the Academy Award for Best Art Direction, and Gene Havlick and Gene Milford shared the Academy Award for Best Film Editing.

The film was nominated for the Academy Award for Best Picture, but lost to The Life of Emile Zola. H.B. Warner lost the Academy Award for Best Supporting Actor to Joseph Schildkraut for the same film. Although Dimitri Tiomkin composed the music, the nomination for the Academy Award for Best Original Score went to Morris Stoloff, the head of the music department at Columbia Pictures. The Oscar went to Charles Previn of Universal Pictures for One Hundred Men and a Girl. John P. Livadary was nominated for the Academy Award for Best Sound Mixing, but lost to Thomas Moulton for The Hurricane. Charles C. Coleman, nominated for the Academy Award for Best Assistant Director, lost to Robert Webb for In Old Chicago. This was the last year an Oscar was awarded in this category.

American Film Institute (AFI) list nominations
 AFI's 100 Years...100 Movies
 AFI's 100 Years of Film Scores
 AFI's 100 Years...100 Movies (10th Anniversary Edition)
 AFI's 10 Top 10 – Fantasy Film

Later reissues and remakes
In 1942, the film was re-released as The Lost Horizon of Shangri-La''''. A lengthy drunken speech delivered by Robert Conway, in which he cynically mocks war and diplomacy, had already been deleted in the general release version. Capra felt the film made no sense without the scene, and in later years film critic Leslie Halliwell described the missing 12 minutes as "vital". They were restored years later.

In 1952, a 92-minute version of the film was released. It aimed to play down features of the utopia that suggested communist ideals, a sensitive point after a civil war in China resulted in the ascension of Mao Zedong's Communist Party in that country in 1949.

In 1973, the AFI initiated a restoration of the film. The project was undertaken by the UCLA Film and Television Archive (under the supervision of Robert Gitt) and Columbia Pictures and took 13 years to complete. Although all 132 minutes of the original soundtrack were recovered, only 125 minutes of film could be found, so the seven minutes of missing film footage were replaced with a combination of publicity photos of the actors in costume taken during filming and still frames depicting the missing scenes.

Also in 1973, Columbia Pictures produced a modernized musical remake directed by Charles Jarrott and starring Peter Finch and Liv Ullmann. The film featured a score by Burt Bacharach and Hal David.  It was both a critical and financial disaster. It came at the end of an era of expensive musical films ushered in by the huge success, in turn, of Mary Poppins, My Fair Lady, and The Sound of Music.

Adaptations to other mediaLost Horizon was adapted as a radio play starring Ronald Colman and Donald Crisp for the September 15, 1941, broadcast of Lux Radio Theatre. Colman reprised his role for the November 27, 1946, broadcast of Academy Award and the July 24, 1948, broadcast of Favorite Story.

In 1946, Ronald Colman also made a three-record, 78 rpm album based on the film for American Decca Records. The score for the album was by Victor Young.

Another radio adaptation starring Herbert Marshall was broadcast on December 30, 1948, on Hallmark Playhouse.

A stage musical called Shangri-La was produced on Broadway in 1956, but closed after only 21 performances. It was staged for a 1960 Hallmark Hall of Fame television broadcast.

Restoration and home mediaLost Horizon suffered various losses to its original running time over the years:
 March 1937 premiere version: 132 minutes
 September 1937 general release version: 118 minutes
 1942 re-release: 110 minutes
 1948 re-release: restored to 118 minutes
 1952 television version: 92 minutes – the only version in circulation for several decades.
 1986 photochemical restoration: 132 minutes – 125 minutes of footage synchronised to complete premiere version soundtrack; film freeze frames and on-set publicity photos fill in the blank sections.
 1998 digital restoration: 132 minutes – further work was carried out on the 1986 restoration.
 2016 all-new 4K digital restoration: 132 minutes – 126 minutes of footage synchronised to premiere soundtrack, after an extra minute of missing film was discovered.

All three restorations have been released or licensed numerous times worldwide on home video by Sony and their predecessors Columbia Pictures. The 1986 restoration was released on VHS and LaserDisc, while the 1998 restoration was issued on DVD. The 2016 restoration has been released as a digital download and on Blu-ray in various territories, including Australia, the United States and much of Europe.

In popular culture
Harry E. Huffman, owner of a chain of movie theaters in downtown Denver, Colorado, built a replica of the monastery depicted in the film as a private residence in 1937, calling it Shangri-La.

The 1953 short story "The Nine Billion Names of God" by Arthur C. Clarke, set in a Tibetan lamasery, references the film, with the characters nicknaming the lamasery "Shangri-La", and referring to the chief lama as "Sam Jaffe".

Author Harlan Ellison alludes to the film in a 1995 television commentary for the program Sci-Fi Buzz, wherein he laments what he perceives as a prevailing cultural illiteracy.

A few seconds of the film can be seen in the Mad Men Season 7 premiere, "Time Zones" (airdate April 13, 2014), when the character Don Draper briefly watches a late-night broadcast featuring the opening intertitle while visiting his wife Megan in California.

A couple of scenes leading up to the plane crash are incorporated into A Wish for Wings That Work.

See also
 List of films cut over the director's opposition
 List of incomplete or partially lost films

References

Notes

Bibliography

 Capra, Frank. Frank Capra, The Name Above the Title: An Autobiography. New York: The Macmillan Company, 1971. .
 Halliwell, Leslie. Halliwell's Hundred: A Nostalgic Choice of Films from the Golden Age . New York: Charles Scribner's Sons, 1982. .
 McBride, Joseph. Frank Capra: The Catastrophe of Success. New York: Touchstone Books, 1992. .
 Michael, Paul, ed. The Great Movie Book: A Comprehensive Illustrated Reference Guide to the Best-loved Films of the Sound Era. Englewood Cliffs, New Jersey: Prentice-Hall Inc., 1980. .
 Poague, Leland. The Cinema of Frank Capra: An Approach to Film Comedy. London: A.S Barnes and Company Ltd., 1975. .
 Scherle, Victor and William Levy. The Films of Frank Capra. Secaucus, New Jersey: The Citadel Press, 1977. .
 Wiley, Mason and Damien Bona. Inside Oscar: The Unofficial History of the Academy Awards. New York: Ballantine Books, 1987. .

External links

 
 
 
 
 
 Lost Horizon at Virtual History
 Lost Horizon at EditorsGuild.com
 Analysis of the film's three different endings
 Six Screen Plays by Robert Riskin, Edited and Introduced by Pat McGilligan, Berkeley

Streaming audio
 Lost Horizon on Lux Radio Theatre. September 15, 1941
 Lost Horizon on Theater of Romance. February 6, 1945
 Lost Horizon on Academy Award Theater. November 27, 1946
 Lost Horizon on Favorite Story. July 24, 1948
 Lost Horizon on Hallmark Playhouse. December 30, 1948
 Lost Horizon on Theater of Romance''. June 5, 1954

Films about Tibet
1937 films
1930s fantasy drama films
American fantasy drama films
Columbia Pictures films
Films scored by Dimitri Tiomkin
Films based on British novels
Films set in Asia
Films set in the Himalayas
Films shot in California
Films shot in Oregon
Films set in 1935
Films whose art director won the Best Art Direction Academy Award
Films whose editor won the Best Film Editing Academy Award
Films directed by Frank Capra
Lost world films
American romantic fantasy films
Films with screenplays by Robert Riskin
United States National Film Registry films
Utopian films
American black-and-white films
1937 drama films
1930s English-language films
1930s American films